Dhundhar, also known as Jaipur region, is a historical region of Rajasthan state in western India. It includes the districts of Jaipur, Neem ka Thana, Dantaramgarh part of Sikar District lying to the east of the Aravalli Range, Dausa, Sawai Madhopur, Tonk, southern part of Kotputli and the northern part of Karauli District.

The region lies in east-central Rajasthan, and is bounded by the Aravalli Range on the northwest, Ajmer to the west, Mewar region to the southwest, Hadoti region to the south, and Alwar, Bharatpur, and Karauli districts to the east.

Geography 
In 1900, at the times of Jaipur Kingdom, region had a total area of 15,579 square miles (40,349 km²).

The southern and central portions of the region lie in the basin of the Banas River and its ephemeral tributaries, including the Dhund River, which gives its name to the region. The northern portion of the region is drained by the ephemeral Banhanga River, which originates in Jaipur district and flows east to join the Yamuna in Uttar Pradesh state.

History 

Dulhe Rai captured Dhundhar after defeating Alan Singh Chanda, the ruler of the Chanda dynasty.

Dulha Rai, probably the last ruler of the Kachchhapaghata dynasty of Gwalior, had taken possession of it, who had moved to Dausa and made Khoh his capital after Dausa.

Raja Dulherai expanded the state by mixing Manchi in Dhundhar. After Dulherai, his son Kokil Deo defeated the Susawats of Amer and made Amer the capital of Dhundhar after Khoh.

Culture 
Generally liberal policies of the rulers permitted Jainism to flourish at Amber and later at Jaipur.

It continues to be one of the most important centers of Jainism in India. It is here where the Bispanthi/Digambar Terapanthi divisions among the Jains emerged in the 17th century. In the 17th century the Chittor seat of the Bhattarakas of Mula Sangh Saraswati gachchha moved from Champawati to Sanganer and then to Amber and finally to Jaipur where the last Bhattarka was present until 1965. The lineage is:
Narendrakirti (Samvat 1691, Sanganer) –
Surendrakirti (Samvat 1722, Amber) –
Jagatkirti –
Devendrakirti –
Mahendrakirti –
Kshemendrakirti (Samvat 1815, Jaipur) –
Surendrakirti –
Sukhendrakirti –
Nayankirti –
Devendrakirti –
Mahendrakirti –
Chandrakirti.

References 

History of Jaipur
Regions of Rajasthan
Historical regions